Aircraft Designs Inc was a US aircraft design and manufacturing firm founded in Monterey, California by Martin Hollmann in 1976. Apart from working on its own designs, the firm provides design and engineering analysis to other aerospace ventures.

Hollmann and his company carried out much subcontract work, particularity in his areas of expertise, including aeroelasticity and structural analysis. He also designed a number of gyroplanes.

The company was dissolved on 30 January 2012 and owner Martin Hollmann died 12 October 2012 of cancer.

Aircraft

References

External links
 Aircraft Designs Inc website

Companies established in 1986
Defunct aircraft manufacturers of the United States
Companies based in Monterey County, California
1986 establishments in California